Godliver Gordian is a Tanzanian actress. She is a part of the New York-based humanitarian organization, Global Medical Relief Fund, and has helped albino graduates find jobs by speaking to employers on their behalf, irrespective of the fears associated with albinos in Tanzania.

Career
Gordian was starred in a Jordan Riber 2012 half-hour Swahili language TV Series titled, Siri ya Mtungi, in which she played the role of "Cheusi". The film also featured the likes of Beatrice Taisamo, Yvonne Cherrie and others.

In 2015, she acted the leading role in a Tanzanian drama film by Chande Omar titled, Aisha.

In 2016, she was nominated for The African Film and Arts Festival (TAFF) awards in the Best Actress category, for her role in the film, Aisha. For the same role and film, she was nominated for the Azam Bongo Movie Awards in the Best Actress category at the 2016 Zanzibar International Film Festival (ZIFF), which she won.

She was also featured in the 2016 comedy-drama film by Seko Shamte titled, Homecoming.

She was the casting director in the 2017 multi-award-winning Tanzanian Swahili language drama film by Amil Shivji titled, T-JUNCTION, starring: Magdalena Christopher, Hawa Alisa (Hawa Ally), Cojack Chilo.

In 2018, she was starred in Jordan Riber's Swahili language drama film, Bahasha (The Envelope), in which she played the role of Hidaya. Other featured stars include Ayoub Bombwe and Godliver Gordian.

She also featured in Seko Shamte's Binti, a Tanzanian drama film slated to be released in 2021. She played the role of "Rose".

Filmography

Accolades

References

External links
 Godliver Gordian on IMDb
 Godliver Gordian on Mubi

Tanzanian actresses
Living people
Year of birth missing (living people)